Rokeya Rahman Kabeer (4 October 1925 – 28 July 2000) was a Bangladeshi academic and feminist.

Early life
Kabeer was born on 4 October 1925 in Kolkata, West Bengal. Her father, Mujibur Rahman, was an Indian Civil Service officer. She studied in Loreto Convent, Darjeeling. She graduated from Lady Brabourne College in geography. She completed her Masters from Presidency College Calcutta in history. She became involved with secular left wing politics in college.

Career
After the Partition of India in 1947, Kabeer left Kolkata, India for East Bengal, Pakistan. She settled in Chittagong where she worked as a school teacher. She afterwards worked as a school teacher in Dhaka. She moved to London, United Kingdom to do a second Masters in history from the University of London. After graduation she joined Eden Girls' College as the chair of the history department. She created an award-winning documentary on the archaeological site in Mainamati. In 1968 she joined Chittagong Girls’ College as its principal. She left for England soon for further studies and returned to Bangladesh in 1976. After returning from England she became a full-time activist. She created Saptagram Nari Swanirbhar Parishad in Faridpur to campaign for the rights of women. The organisation by the 1980s had helped thousands of women. She founded the Shoptogram Silk Production Centre which was handed over to Brac in 1999.

Death and legacy
Kabeer died on 28 July 2000. The Rokeya Rahman Kabir Women's Development Centre, named after her, was created to further women's rights in Bangladesh. Her daughter, Naila Kabeer, is a feminist.

References

1925 births
2000 deaths
People from Kolkata
Lady Brabourne College alumni
Alumni of the University of London
Academic staff of Eden Mohila College
Bangladeshi feminists
Place of death missing